"There Is a Party" is a 1995 song by Swiss artist DJ BoBo, released as the third single from his 1994 album by the same name. It features vocals by American singer Lori Glori (a.k.a. Lori Hölzel) and peaked at number nine in Belgium, number 13 in Switzerland, number 15 in Finland and number 17 in Germany. On the Eurochart Hot 100, it reached number 33. Outside Europe, the single peaked at number 89 in Australia. It sold to Gold in Germany.

Critical reception
In their review of There Is a Party, Pan-European magazine Music & Media wrote, "A truly new musical direction is distinct by the reggae-tinged title track. We hear a guitar and it's like the Boney M girls are looking over Bobo's shoulders. One key to Euro's future is in Bobo's hands."

Music video
The music video for "There Is a Party" was directed by Frank Paul Husmann-Labusga and was filmed in Miami, Florida. He also directed the videos for "Freedom" and "Let the Dream Come True".

Track listing

Charts

Weekly charts

Year-end charts

References

 

1995 singles
1995 songs
DJ BoBo songs
English-language Swiss songs
Music videos directed by Frank Paul Husmann
Songs written by Axel Breitung
Songs written by DJ BoBo